Minatree Catron House, also known as Minatree Acres, is a historic home located near Lexington, Lafayette County, Missouri.  It was built about 1843, and is a two-story, central passage plan, Greek Revival style brick I-house. It has a one-story rear ell. The front facade features a two-story pedimented portico supported by square brick columns.

It was listed on the National Register of Historic Places in 1997.

References

Houses on the National Register of Historic Places in Missouri
Greek Revival houses in Missouri
Houses completed in 1843
Houses in Lafayette County, Missouri
National Register of Historic Places in Lafayette County, Missouri